Héctor Hugo Olivares Ventura (born May 24, 1944) is a Mexican politician from the Institutional Revolutionary Party. He has served as Deputy of the LII, LVI and LX Legislatures of the Mexican Congress and as Senator of the L, LI, LIV and LV Legislatures representing Aguascalientes.

He was the President of the Chamber of Deputies in 1996.

References

1944 births
Living people
Politicians from Aguascalientes
Members of the Senate of the Republic (Mexico)
Members of the Chamber of Deputies (Mexico)
Presidents of the Chamber of Deputies (Mexico)
Presidents of the Senate of the Republic (Mexico)
Institutional Revolutionary Party politicians
21st-century Mexican politicians
People from Pabellón de Arteaga Municipality
National Autonomous University of Mexico alumni
Mexican male writers
20th-century Mexican politicians